Events from the year 2013 in Poland.

Incumbents

Events
March 19 - Two football fans were killed and 52 injured in a bus crash in central Poland.

Births

Deaths

January 23 - Józef Glemp, 83, Polish Cardinal of the Roman Catholic Church. (born 1929)
April 11 - Hilary Koprowski, 96, Polish virologist and immunologist. (born 1916)
October 28 - Tadeusz Mazowiecki, 86, 1st Prime Minister of Poland. (born 1927)

See also 
 2013 in Polish television

References 

 
2010s in Poland
Years of the 21st century in Poland
Poland